Daugava Stadium is a multi-purpose stadium in Liepāja, Latvia. It is currently used mostly for football matches and is the home stadium of FK Liepāja, also it was the home stadium of FHK Liepājas Metalurgs. The stadium holds 4,022 people, and hosted the Baltic Cup 1992. The women's national side have also played at the stadium.

From 1925 to 1934 the stadium was named "Strādnieku stadions" (workers' stadium), from 1934 to 1990 "Pilsētas stadions" (town stadium).

References

 http://loc.lv/lv/stadioni/daugavas/

Buildings and structures in Liepāja
Football venues in Latvia
Multi-purpose stadiums in Latvia